Gilissen is a surname. Notable people with this surname include:

 Cornelia Gilissen (1915–1994), American diver
 Erik Gilissen (born 1968), Belgian politician
 Filip Gilissen (born 1980), Belgian artist
 Paul Gilissen (1934–2020), Dutch politician
 Tim Gilissen (born 1982), Dutch footballer